Aglaonema is a genus of flowering plants in the arum family, Araceae. They are native to tropical and subtropical regions of Asia and New Guinea. They are known commonly as Chinese evergreens.

Description
Aglaonemas are evergreen or perennials, with stems growing erect, or decumbent and creeping; stems that grow along the ground may actively root at the nodes, similar to other aroids. There is generally a crown of wide leaf-blades which, in both wild and cultivated forms, are often variegated with a silver and green coloration. The inflorescence bears unisexual flowers in a spadix, with a short zone of female flowers near the base, and a wider zone of male flowers nearer the tip. The fruit is a fleshy berry that ripens red. The fruit is a thin layer covering one large seed.

Plants of the genus are native to humid, shady tropical forest habitat, normally in South and Southeast Asia.

Cultivation and uses

Aglaonema have been grown as luck-bringing ornamental plants in Asia for centuries. They were introduced to the West in 1885, when they were first brought to the Royal Botanic Gardens, Kew. They have been cultivated, hybridized, and bred into a wide array of cultivars. They can adapt to live in low-light conditions and are therefore popular choices for houseplants as well as indoor landscaping, commonly seen in waiting areas, lobbies, office buildings, etc. Their preference for relatively low to bright/indirect light levels helps them to thrive under artificial lighting.

This (mainly) tropical genus is known for its intolerance of cold temperatures. The injury manifests in dark, greasy-looking patches on the foliage, the result of cellular walls bursting from cold temperatures and/or excess water retention. Despite their innate need for water, Aglaonemas cannot tolerate their roots being excessively wet for prolonged periods of time, and a “drying-out” period must be observed between waterings to avoid rot; it is best for growers to note that the substrate has dried (at least one or two inches from the surface) before irrigating again. The optimal substrate is one that drains rapidly but still retains consistent moisture, predominantly made up of perlite, pumice, lava rock, and some moisture-retaining organic material, such as earthworm castings, coconut coir, sphagnum moss, or peat moss. Optional slow-release granular fertilizers benefit Chinese evergreens, as well, albeit in minimal amounts. Most Aglaonemas are not heavy feeders. More importantly, inert materials (for drainage) are key - excess organic matter leads to anaerobic soil conditions and, ultimately, root rot.

Cultivars have been selected for their shape and size, and especially for the color and pattern of the leaves. Many have white or cream-colored stems. Some have also been developed to tolerate colder temperatures. The most common cultivar is 'Silver Queen', which has gained the Royal Horticultural Society's Award of Garden Merit. Other cultivars include ‘Cutlass’, ‘Sparkling Sarah’, ‘Red Siam’, and ‘Silver Bay’.

Most propagation of Aglaonema is done with cuttings and by dividing the basal shoots. Care of the houseplant mainly involves protecting it from cold temperatures and excessive sunlight, and removing any inflorescences that develop, which can shorten the life of the plant. Aglaonema are prone to false mites (Brevipalpus californicus). They may also acquire populations of nematodes, such as root-knot nematodes and Pratylenchus species, which cause root lesions. Pathogens include the fungus Myrothecium roridum and bacteria such as Pseudomonas cichorii, Erwinia chrysanthemi, and Xanthomonas campestris, which can all cause leaf spot. Colletotrichum fungi can cause anthracnose.

The NASA Clean Air Study observed that the species A. modestum was effective at helping to remove the common household air toxins formaldehyde and benzene, another reason for their popularity in public and office spaces.

Aglaonema plants are poisonous due to calcium oxalate crystals; if ingested or absorbed through a mucous membrane, all aroid plants can cause irritation. The juice can cause skin irritation, itching, hives and painful rash. If swallowed, seek medical attention promptly. Depending on the amount ingested, the sensation has been compared to “swallowing sand” or “a throat full of glass shards”, hence the nickname “dumb-cane” being applied to the sister-genus Dieffenbachia as well as Aglaonema.

Diversity
Species include:

 Aglaonema brevispathum – Indochina
 Aglaonema chermsiriwattanae – Thailand
 Aglaonema cochinchense – Vietnam, Cambodia, Thailand, Malaysia
 Aglaonema commutatum – Philippines, Sulawesi; naturalized in West Indies
 Aglaonema cordifolium – Mindanao
 Aglaonema costatum – Fox's aglaonema, spotted evergreen – Pulau Langkawi, Indochina
 Aglaonema densinervium – Philippines, Sulawesi
 Aglaonema flemingianum – Terengganu
 Aglaonema hookerianum – Darjiling, Assam, Bangladesh, Bhutan, Myanmar
 Aglaonema marantifolium – Maluku, New Guinea
 Aglaonema modestum – Japanese-leaf – Bangladesh, Indochina, southern China
 Aglaonema nebulosum – Borneo, Malaysia, Sumatra
 Aglaonema nitidum – Borneo, Malaysia, Sumatra, Java, Indochina
 Aglaonema ovatum – Laos, Thailand, Vietnam
 Aglaonema philippinense – Philippines, Sulawesi
 Aglaonema pictum – Nias, Sumatra
 Aglaonema pumilum – Myanmar, Thailand
 Aglaonema roebelinii – Luzon
 Aglaonema rotundum – Sumatra
 Aglaonema simplex – Malayan-sword – Yunnan, Indochina, Malaysia, Indonesia, Philippines
 Aglaonema tricolor – Philippines
Aglaonema vittatum – Sumatra, Lingga Islands

References

External links

The Genus Aglaonema. aroid.org

 
Aroideae
Araceae genera
House plants